Sir Thomas Lonsdale Webster  (1868–1930) was a British civil servant who served as a clerk in the Parliament of the United Kingdom. 

Webster entered public service as a clerk in the General Post Office in 1887.

He was appointed a Companion of the Order of the Bath in the 1912 Birthday Honours. Webster served as Clerk of the House of Commons from 1921 until his death in 1930. He was appointed a Knight Commander of the Order of the Bath in the 1922 Birthday Honours.

He was the father of the classicist T. B. L. Webster.

References

1868 births
1930 deaths
British civil servants
Clerks of the House of Commons
Knights Commander of the Order of the Bath